Marija Ibragimova (born 17 September 1996) is a Latvian footballer who plays as a goalkeeper and has appeared for the Latvia women's national team.

Career
Ibragimova has been capped for the Latvia national team, appearing for the team during the 2019 FIFA Women's World Cup qualifying cycle.

References

External links
 
 
 

1996 births
Living people
Latvian women's footballers
Women's association football goalkeepers
Rīgas FS players
Latvia women's youth international footballers
Latvia women's international footballers